Sinead Jack (born  in Mount Hope, Trinidad) is a Trinidad and Tobago female volleyball player of the Trinidad and Tobago women's national volleyball team.

Career
She participated at the 2011 Women's Pan-American Volleyball Cup. On club level she played for AZS Białystok in 2011.
Jack won the 2013 NORCECA Championship Best Middle Blocker award. She played in 2013-2016 for the Russian club Uralochka NTMK. For the 2016-2017 season she signed with the Turkish club Galatasaray Istanbul. She won the 2017 Pan-American Cup Best Middle Blocker award and tha same award in the 2018 Central American and Caribbean Games.

Awards

Clubs
 2016-17 Turkish League -  Runner-Up, with Galatasaray

Individuals
 2013 NORCECA Championship "Best Middle Blocker"
 2017 Pan-American Cup "Best Middle Blocker"
 2018 Central American and Caribbean Games "Best Middle Blocker"

References

External links
 

1993 births
Living people
Trinidad and Tobago women's volleyball players
Trinidad and Tobago expatriate sportspeople in Turkey
Trinidad and Tobago expatriate sportspeople in Japan
Galatasaray S.K. (women's volleyball) players